is a Japanese comedy manga series written by Kōji Kumeta and illustrated by Yasu, telling the everyday lives of five young female rakugo comedians. It was serialised in Kodansha's Bessatsu Shōnen Magazine from September 2009 to September 2013 and the chapters compiled into six tankōbon volumes. An anime television series adaptation animated by J.C.Staff aired in Japan between July and September 2012, with an original video animation episode released in February 2013.

Characters
All of the girls' surnames end with the character , which is often used in stage names for performers.

 (Anime), Kana Asumi (CD)
The substantial protagonist of the manga, who has long red hair. She behaves like Edokko and speaks in a masculine tone of Edo speech, but she is actually from Tokushima Prefecture. Despite her good looks, the way she talks and her flat chest tend to lead the others into suspecting her as a boy cross-dressing as a girl. She acts as a tsukkomi and often says "". Her name is a pun on Bloody Mary.

 (Anime), Ikumi Hayama (CD)
A ponytailed girl with brown hair who is a lucky girl and leads a carefree life. She often leads the stories to other subjects. Kumeta introduces her as the true protagonist of the manga.

 (Anime), Erena Ono (CD)
A girl with cream-coloured hair who is the youngest girl in the group. To match her childlike figure, she often pretends to be cute in front of others, but her internal dialogue shows her true thoughts to the audience; cynical and manipulative. Her name is a pun on Hello Kitty and kigurumi.

 (Anime), Kana Hanazawa (CD)
A girl with glasses and green hair who is a smart, cool-headed, yet violent girl. She is a childhood friend of Tetora's.

 (Anime/CD)
A girl with straight black hair who is very good at acting, but is an unlucky girl and is very emotionally unstable. Her name is a play on several words, all of which have to do with things that are very negative in nature. Anrakutei also sounds similar to the word unlucky. Also, the kanji in her name minus the character  could be read very literally, as falling into darkness and coming of anguish.

A girl in a luchador wrestling mask who just happens to be in the scene at certain points.

A girl who has short blonde and pink hair. She wears a strawberry-patterned hakama and a large ribbon on her head. Her only appearance is in the last episode of the anime. True to her name, Uzannu is annoying with her fast-talking, condescending attitude, and mimicry of the other girls. Uzannu purposely tries to upset the character balance of the show with her obnoxiousness and make the show her own, even going so far as singing her own version of the opening theme song with personalized lyrics. Nonetheless, the girls manage to drive her away.

Media

Manga
Joshiraku began as a manga series written by Kōji Kumeta and illustrated by Yasu. It was serialized in Kodansha's Bessatsu Shōnen Magazine between the October 2009 and October 2013 issues – from September 9, 2009, to September 9, 2013. The chapters were also collected and released into six tankōbon volumes under the Wild KC imprint, from May 17, 2010, to November 8, 2013. A limited edition of the fifth volume was bundled with an anime episode on DVD disc.

Anime
A 13-episode anime television series adaptation animated by J.C.Staff aired in Japan between July and September 2012. An original video animation episode was released on DVD with the fifth manga volume on February 8, 2013. In 2019, Maiden Japan licensed the series.

Episode list

References

External links
Anime official website 

2009 manga
2012 anime television series debuts
Animeism
Comedy anime and manga
Theatre in anime and manga
J.C.Staff
Kodansha manga
Kōji Kumeta
Maiden Japan
Rakugo
Shōnen manga